Inonotus cuticularis is a species of fungus in the family Hymenochaetaceae. A plant pathogen, it has a circumpolar distribution, and is found in the temperate zone from eastern U.S. and Canada to Japan, China, Russia and south to central Europe.

References 

Fungal plant pathogens and diseases
cuticularis
Fungi described in 1790
Fungi of Asia
Fungi of Europe
Fungi of North America